A statue of former Mexican professional golfer Lorena Ochoa was installed in Puerto Vallarta, in 2012.

In 2015, the bronze sculpture was removed from Centro for restoration, and later reported as missing or stolen. As of 2020, the statue is located at the entrance of Marina Vallarta Golf Club.

See also

 2012 in art

References

External links
 

2012 establishments in Mexico
2012 sculptures
Bronze sculptures in Mexico
Centro, Puerto Vallarta
Golf in Mexico
Monuments and memorials in Jalisco
Outdoor sculptures in Puerto Vallarta
Relocated buildings and structures
Sculptures of sports
Sculptures of women in Mexico
Statues in Jalisco